Nelson Chabay (29 June 1940 – 2 November 2018) was a Uruguayan footballer who played as a defender.

Career
Born in Montevideo, Chabay played for Racing Club de Montevideo, Racing Club de Avellaneda and Huracán.

He earned 4 caps for the Uruguay national team.

Later life and death
He died on 2 November 2018 at a hospital in Buenos Aires following an illness. He had suffered a stroke a few years earlier.

References

1940 births
2018 deaths
Uruguayan footballers
Uruguay international footballers
Racing Club de Montevideo players
Racing Club de Avellaneda footballers
Club Atlético Huracán footballers
Association football defenders
Uruguayan expatriate footballers
Uruguayan expatriate sportspeople in Argentina
Expatriate footballers in Argentina
Club Atlético Colón managers
Unión de Santa Fe managers